Grindavík is a fishing town on the Southern Peninsula of Iceland not far from the tuya Þorbjörn.

It is one of the few cities with a harbour on this coast. Most of the inhabitants work in the fishing industry.

History

Landnáma or The Book of Settlements mentions that around 934, two Viking settlers, Molda-Gnúpur Hrólfsson  and Þórir Haustmyrkur Vígbjóðsson , arrived in the Reykjanes area. Þórir settled in Selvogur and Krísuvík and Molda-Gnúpur in Grindavík.

The sons of Moldar-Gnúpur established three settlements; Þórkötlustaðahverfi , Járngerðarstaðarhverfi  and Staðarhverfi . The modern version of Grindavík is situated mainly in what was Járngerðarstaðarhverfi.

In June 1627 Grindavík was raided by Barbary Pirates in an event known as the Turkish Abductions. Twelve Icelanders and three Danes, along with two vessels were taken, and with captives taken from other Icelandic settlements, transported into slavery in Algiers.

The origins of the municipality can be traced to Einar Einarsson's decision to move there to build and run a shop in 1897.  During that time the population was only around 360. Fishing had for centuries been a crucial element in the survival of Grindavík's population, but fishing trips were often dangerous. Men were frequently lost at sea and the catch not always stable. However, when a safer access point to land was created at Hópið  in 1939, fishing conditions changed dramatically.  From 1950 serious development in the fishing industry had begun to take place. Grindavík was declared a municipality in 1974.

Activities
A short distance to the north, there is the Blue Lagoon, a geothermal spa using hot and mineralized waters from the nearby Svartsengi power station.

Ungmennafélag Grindavíkur (Umfg) is the town's sport club, and the town contains the Grindavíkurvöllur stadium.

The Leif the Lucky Bridge spans the Álfagjá rift valley  that marks the boundary of the Eurasian and North American continental tectonic plates. It was built in 2002 and named in honor of Icelandic explorer Leif Erikson, who travelled from Europe to explore North America 500 years before Columbus.

The Icelandic Saltfish Museum in Grindavík opened in 2002.

Sports
Grindavik has a football team playing in the Icelandic league.

Notable residents
The Icelandic writer Guðbergur Bergsson was born here, and Kalli Bjarni, the first winner of the Icelandic version of Pop Idol, lives in the town. The Spanish publisher and writer Jaime Salinas Bonmatí, engaged to Guðbergur Bergsson, lived, died and is buried here. Icelandic footballer Alfreð Finnbogason was also born in Grindavík.

Ex-Leeds United footballer, Lee Sharpe, had a spell with Grindavík football club, at the end of his career, c.2006.

Naval Communication Facility
Near Grindavík, the United States Navy operates Naval Radio Transmitter Facility Grindavik. It uses several antennas, including two guyed masts. The taller mast replaced a  mast, and the second replaced a mast of same height.

Twin towns – sister cities

Grindavík is twinned with:
 Ílhavo, Portugal
 Jonzac, France
 Penistone, England, United Kingdom
 Piteå, Sweden
 Rovaniemi, Finland
 Uniejów, Poland

See also
 List of cities and towns in Iceland
 Reykjanes
 Geothermal power in Iceland

References

External links

 Official website 
 More information and photos about Grindavík on Hit Iceland

Reykjanes
Municipalities of Iceland
Populated places in Southern Peninsula (Iceland)